Byrne is the English author Anthony Burgess's last novel, published posthumously in 1995.

Composed mostly in the same ottava rima stanzas that Byron used for his Don Juan, the story follows the fortunes of Michael Byrne, an Irishman with some Spanish ancestors who settled in Ireland after a war between England's Royal Navy and the Spanish Armada in the 16th century.

A painter and composer whose career is never as spectacular as his ambitions, and a determined womanizer who fathers children across the globe, Byrne becomes embroiled with the Nazi regime in 1930s Germany.

Eventually he vanishes, presumed dead in Africa. But years later, his twin sons, now middle-aged, one a doubting priest, the other suffering from a debilitating disease, receive from Byrne, who is still alive, an invitation to London, where he will read his last will and testament.

References

1995 British novels
Novels by Anthony Burgess
Novels published posthumously
Verse novels
Poetry by Anthony Burgess
Hutchinson (publisher) books
Novels set in the 1930s